James Clayton Flowers (born December 25, 1915) is an American retired military pilot who served with the Tuskegee Airmen during World War II.

Early life 
James Clayton Flowers was born on December 25, 1915 in Las Cruces, New Mexico.

Military service

He was a pilot with the 99th Fighter Squadron, 332nd Fighter Group for five years.

Later life
After WWII he and his wife Evelyn started a family. Flowers worked as a school teacher in the New York School System. After retirement he and his wife relocated to New Mexico. They had two children. New Mexico held a ceremony to honor the Tuskegee Airmen in March 2014. Flowers was present for the dedication at the New Mexico Veterans' Memorial. He turned 100 on 25 December 2015.

Awards
Congressional Gold Medal awarded to the Tuskegee Airmen in 2006

See also
 Executive Order 9981
 List of Tuskegee Airmen
 Military history of African Americans
 The Tuskegee Airmen (movie)

Further reading
The Tuskegee Airmen: An Illustrated History, 1939-1949
"Born to Fly the Skies." Weirton Daily Times (Weirton, W.Va.) 23 February 2013. Web. 17 January 2014.
"Tuskegee Airmen Pilot Listing." Tuskegee University, 2014, Web. 17 January 2014.

References

Notes

External links
 
 Tuskegee Airmen at Tuskegee University
 Tuskegee Airmen Archives at the University of California, Riverside Libraries.
 Tuskegee Airmen, Inc.
 Tuskegee Airmen National Historic Site (U.S. National Park Service) 
 Tuskegee Airmen National Museum
 Fly (2009 play about the 332d Fighter Group)
James Clayton Flowers Interview

1915 births
Living people
United States Army Air Forces pilots of World War II
African-American centenarians
American centenarians
Men centenarians
Tuskegee Airmen
Congressional Gold Medal recipients
United States Army Air Forces officers